The name example is reserved by the Internet Engineering Task Force (IETF) as a domain name that may not be installed as a top-level domain in the Domain Name System (DNS) of the Internet.

Reserved DNS names
By publication of RFC 2606 in 1999, the Internet Engineering Task Force reserved the DNS labels example, invalid, localhost, and test so that they may not be installed into the root zone of the Domain Name System.

The reason for reservation of these top-level domain names is to reduce the likelihood of conflict and confusion. This allows the use of these names for either documentation purposes or in local testing scenarios.

Purpose
The top-level domain  is explicitly intended to be used in documentation or other technical writing, when domain names are presented as examples in usage or presentation of concepts of the Domain Name System or the Internet.

See also
 example.com
 192.0.2.0/24, 198.51.100.0/24, 203.0.113.0/24  – IPv4 ranges reserved for documentation and example code by RFC 5737
 2001:db8::/32 – IPv6 range reserved for documentation by RFC 3849

References

Top-level domains
Placeholder names
Computer-related introductions in 1999

ja:トップレベルドメイン#特殊用途